Alternanthera subscaposa, synonym Lithophila subscaposa, is a species of plant in the family Amaranthaceae. It is endemic to the Galápagos Islands.

References

subscaposa
Flora of the Galápagos Islands
Vulnerable plants
Taxonomy articles created by Polbot